Neil J. LeClair (born 23 February 1956) is a Canadian politician.

He was elected to the Legislative Assembly of Prince Edward Island in the 2007 provincial election. He represented the electoral district of Tignish-Palmer Road and is a member of the Liberal Party.

On June 12, 2007, LeClair was appointed to the Executive Council of Prince Edward Island as Minister of Agriculture. In January 2009, LeClair was moved to Minister of Fisheries, Aquaculture and Rural Development. He was defeated by his Progressive Conservative opponent, Hal Perry in the 2011 election. In January 2015, LeClair announced he would again seek the riding's Liberals nomination for the 2015 election, but was defeated by Perry, who had crossed the floor to the Liberals in 2013.

Election results

References

1956 births
Living people
Members of the Executive Council of Prince Edward Island
People from Tignish, Prince Edward Island
Prince Edward Island Liberal Party MLAs
21st-century Canadian politicians